Ethel W. (Edie) Hedlin (born 1944) is an American archivist, librarian, and historian. She has held many positions within the archival profession, including service to the National Archives and Records Administration, Wells Fargo Bank, and the Ohio Historical Society. She has served the Society of American Archivists as Council Member, chairperson of the Business Archives Committee,  Vice President, and President. She was the Society's 49th president and served from 1993 to 1994. She has also been a longtime member of the NHPRC California Historical Records Advisory Board.

Career 
Hedlin first began work within the archival profession with the Ohio Historical Society as the institutional records specialist and State archives specialist.

After earning her PhD from Duke University in 1974, she published her dissertation, "Earnest Cox and Colonization: A White Racist's Response to Black Repatriation, 1922-1966", which has been heavily cited throughout the archival and historical professions.

In 1975, Hedlin began working with the Wells Fargo Bank in San Francisco, California as their corporate archivist.

In 1994, Hedlin became Director of the Office of Smithsonian Institution Archives, which is responsible for the official records of the Smithsonian Institution. Before she left in 2005, she overlooked the transition to electronic and digital archives as well as the first websites of the Institution.

Publications 
Hedlin has written several books and articles on archival technique, including the 1978 article "Business Archives: An Introduction". Some other notable works include The Ohio Black History Guide (with Sara S. Fuller, 1975), "Chinatown" Revisited (1986), and Archival Programs in the Southeast: A Preliminary Assessment (1984).

References 

1944 births
Living people
Duke University alumni
American archivists
Female archivists
American librarians
American women librarians
American historians
American women historians
Presidents of the Society of American Archivists
21st-century American women